Ministry of Economy and Finance or Ministry of Finance and Economy may refer to:
Ministry of Economy and Finance (Benin)
Ministry of Finance and Economy (Brunei)
Ministry of Economy and Finance (Cambodia)
Ministry of Economy and Finance (Ecuador)
Ministry of the Economy and Finance (France)
Ministry of Economy and Finance (Haiti)
Ministry of Economy and Finance (Italy)

Ministry of Economy and Finance (Peru)
Ministry of Economy and Finance (South Korea)
Ministry of Economy and Finance (Spain)

See also
Ministry of Finance
Ministry of the economy